Sugababes are a British girl group composed of Mutya Buena, Keisha Buchanan and Siobhán Donaghy. The lineup changed three times before returning to the original lineup in 2012.

Formed in 1998 by All Saints manager Ron Tom, Sugababes released their debut album One Touch through London Records in November 2000, which achieved moderate success and produced the top-ten single "Overload". In 2001, Donaghy departed the group and was replaced by Heidi Range. With Range's introduction, the group experienced a higher level of commercial success and went on to release three multi-platinum albums: Angels with Dirty Faces (2002), Three (2003) and Taller in More Ways (2005). In December 2005, Buena left the group and was replaced by Amelle Berrabah. Following the release of their first greatest hits album, the new line-up released two further studio albums: Change (2007) and Catfights and Spotlights (2008).

In September 2009, after 11 years in Sugababes, Buchanan, the final original member, was replaced by Jade Ewen. Range, Berrabah and Ewen released the group's seventh studio album, Sweet 7 (2010), after which they signed to RCA Records, before taking an indefinite hiatus in 2011. That year, the original lineup reformed as Mutya Keisha Siobhan and released the single "Flatline". The trio regained the name Sugababes in 2019, and recorded a rendition of the song "Flowers" with DJ Spoony. In 2021, the Sugababes re-released One Touch in honour of its 20th anniversary, with plans for new music. In 2022, they appeared at various festivals before embarking on a headline tour and released The Lost Tapes, an album consisting of previously unreleased material.

Sugababes have achieved six number-one singles: "Freak like Me", "Round Round", "Hole in the Head", "Push the Button", "Walk This Way" and "About You Now"; the Spice Girls are the only British girl group to have had more. They have also released five UK top ten albums, four of which were certified Platinum in the UK, and have been nominated for six Brit Awards, winning for Best British Dance Act in 2003. They have been a long-term fixture in the British tabloids due to their several line-up changes and alleged group infighting.

History

1998–2001: One Touch and Donaghy's departure 
Sugababes were formed in 1998 by All Saints manager Ron Tom and Sarah Stennett, and First Access Entertainment. Siobhán Donaghy and Mutya Buena, both aged just 13, had been signed as solo artists, but decided to work together after performing at the same showcase. While working in the studio, Buena invited her best friend Keisha Buchanan to watch them. Manager Ron Tom decided the three girls were to be a trio, likening their different appearances to the United Colors of Benetton campaign. Originally dubbed the Sugababies, the group's name was tweaked to Sugababes when they were signed by London Records to give the group a more mature image.

The group's debut single, "Overload", peaked at number 6 on the UK Singles Chart in 2000 and was nominated for a BRIT Award for Best Single. The group co-wrote most of the tracks on debut album One Touch with the help of All Saints producer Cameron McVey. One Touch peaked at number 26 on the UK Albums Chart. The album produced three more top 40 hits—"New Year", "Run for Cover" and "Soul Sound". The sales of One Touch did not meet London Records' expectations, and they dropped the group in 2001. It was later certified Gold by the BPI and had sold 220,000 copies in the UK by 2008 according to Music Week.

During a Japanese promotional tour in August 2001, Donaghy left the group. She stated initially that she wanted to pursue a fashion career, but was eventually diagnosed with clinical depression amid reports of in-fighting amongst the group's members. Donaghy later stated that she was forced out of the group by Buchanan and called Buchanan the "first bully" in her life. Former Atomic Kitten member Heidi Range replaced Donaghy.

2002–2004: Angels with Dirty Faces and Three
Having already started work on a second album with new member Range, the trio looked for a new record label, eventually signing to Island Records. Their first single on the new label, "Freak like Me" scored the group their first UK number 1 single. Follow-up single "Round Round" also debuted on top of the UK Singles Chart and peaked at number 2 in Ireland, the Netherlands and New Zealand. Both singles were certified silver by the BPI. On the back of the success of the singles, the group's second album, Angels with Dirty Faces, debuted at number 2 on the UK Albums Chart and was later certified triple Platinum, selling almost a million copies in the UK alone. It is to date their highest-selling album. In the UK, the third single from the album, a ballad titled "Stronger", gained the girls their third consecutive top ten hit in their native country. The track was released as a double-A side with "Angels with Dirty Faces" in the UK, the latter song chosen as the theme tune to The Powerpuff Girls Movie. A fourth single, the Sting-sampling "Shape", made the top ten in the Netherlands and Ireland in early 2003.

The group's third album, Three, was released in late 2003 and reached number 3 on the UK Albums Chart, earning the group a BRIT Award nomination for Best Album. Certified double Platinum, it has sold 855,000 copies to date. The album was preceded by lead single "Hole in the Head", which became the group's third UK number 1 single. It also reached number 2 in Ireland, the Netherlands and Norway, and became the Sugababes' first (and to date only) single to chart in the United States, reaching number 96 on the Billboard Hot 100. Follow-up single "Too Lost in You" appeared on the soundtrack to the film Love Actually and went top ten in Germany, the Netherlands, Norway and the UK. The album's third single, "In the Middle", was released in 2004 and garnered the group another BRIT Award nomination for Best Single; like its successor, the ballad "Caught in a Moment", it went to number 8 on the UK Singles Chart. In 2004, the trio sang on the Band Aid 20 remake of "Do They Know It's Christmas?", which went to number 1 in the UK in December.

Around this time, the group's perceived "moodiness", alleged backstage catfights, and press junket tantrums were tabloid fodder in Britain. They were surrounded by continuous rumours of in-fighting within the group and constant split reports. Rumours suggested that Buchanan and Buena had bullied Range, although Range herself repeatedly denied such allegations; Buena later admitted that she did not speak to Range when she first joined. According to Buchanan, there was only one serious fallout between herself and Range during a 2004 gig in Dublin, a disagreement around Britney Spears's song "Toxic".

2005–2006: Taller in More Ways, Buena's departure, and compilation
After a hiatus, during which Buena gave birth to her daughter Thalia, the Sugababes released their thirteenth single, "Push the Button" in October 2005. The song debuted at number 1 in the UK and remained in the position for three consecutive weeks. It also peaked at number one in Ireland, Austria and New Zealand, and reached the top three across Europe and in Australia. Certified silver in the UK, it was later nominated at the BRIT Awards for Best Single. Parent album Taller in More Ways became the group's first UK number 1 album. The group was number 1 on the singles, album, airplay and download charts simultaneously, making them the first girl group to achieve such a feat. Taller in More Ways was certified double Platinum in the UK.

Following an apparent illness that prevented her from promoting follow-up single "Ugly", Buena left the Sugababes on 21 December 2005. Buena later stated in an interview that she was suffering from postnatal depression after the birth of her daughter combined with the group's increasingly hectic schedules, and chose to leave to spend more time with her daughter. Amelle Berrabah joined the Sugababes in late December 2005, having been chosen by the group's management to replace Buena.

The third single from Taller in More Ways was a re-recorded version of "Red Dress", which was released in early 2006, and gave the Sugababes their third consecutive top five hit from the album, entering the UK Singles Chart at number 4. Berrabah re-recorded three of the album's twelve tracks and co-wrote a new song with Buchanan and Range named "Now You're Gone". The tracks appeared on a re-release of Taller in More Ways that reached number 18 on the UK Albums Chart. The fourth and final single from Taller in More Ways was "Follow Me Home", released only in the UK in June, where it charted at number 32.

In mid-2006, the group returned to the studio to record two new tracks for their first greatest hits collection, titled Overloaded: The Singles Collection. The lead single from the compilation, "Easy" peaked at number 8 on the UK Singles Chart, whilst the compilation album, released in November 2006, peaked at number 3. The album, certified Platinum by the BPI, has sold 598,000 copies. During this time, the group had also announced that they had begun work on their then-untitled fifth studio album.

2007–2008: Change and Catfights and Spotlights
In March 2007, the Sugababes collaborated with fellow British girl group Girls Aloud for their eighteenth single, a cover of the song "Walk This Way" by Aerosmith. The track was released as the official single for Comic Relief. "Walk This Way" became the group's fifth UK number one single.

Following their Greatest Hits Tour, the Sugababes returned to the recording studio in mid-2007 to continue working on Change, their fifth studio album, and the first to feature Berrabah on all tracks. "About You Now" was released as the album's lead single in September 2007. Upon release, the song became the group's sixth UK number one hit and first Hungarian chart-topper. It remained atop the UK Singles Chart for four weeks. "About You Now" was nominated for a 2008 BRIT Award for Best British Single and is to date their highest-selling single, with sales standing at almost 500,000 copies. In the 2009 edition of the Guinness Book of World Records, "About You Now" was listed as the "first track by a British pop act to top the singles chart solely on downloads". The song was also named as the "biggest chart mover to the number one position in the UK".

In October 2007, Change became the group's second UK number 1 album. For the second time, the group topped the singles, album and download charts simultaneously. The album's title track "Change", was released as the second single in December 2007 and peaked at number 13 in the UK. The album sold 494,000 copies in the UK, and was certified Platinum. The third and final single from Change was "Denial", which reached number 15. From March to May 2008, the Sugababes travelled the UK on the thirty-date Change Tour, their biggest tour to date.

Following the Change Tour, Sugababes returned to the studio to write and record tracks for their sixth studio album, Catfights and Spotlights. It was reported that producer Timbaland had approached the Sugababes to work on their sixth album, but due to time restrictions, a collaboration did not occur. "Girls", the lead single from Catfights and Spotlights was released in October 2008. The single peaked at number 3 in the UK, making it their first lead single since One Touch not to reach number 1. The album peaked at number 8 in the UK Albums Chart. Its second and final single, "No Can Do", was released in December and peaked at number 23 in the UK. The Performing Right Society named Sugababes the fourth hardest-working band of 2008 due to the number of concerts they had performed during that year.

2009–2010: Buchanan's departure and Sweet 7
After the release of "No Can Do", the group decided not to go on tour in 2009 and instead focus on writing and recording material for their seventh studio album. The Sugababes travelled to the United States to work on their seventh studio album, Sweet 7. In April 2009, the Sugababes signed a contract with Jay-Z's label Roc Nation, resulting in working with high profile producers. Berrabah also collaborated with Tinchy Stryder for the track "Never Leave You", the third single from his second album, Catch 22 in August 2009. The single debuted on top of the UK charts, making Berrabah the only member of the Sugababes, past and present, to achieve a number one single outside of the group. The lead single from Sweet 7, "Get Sexy", debuted at number 2 on the UK Singles Chart in September 2009.

In September 2009, Berrabah was reported to have left the Sugababes as she had missed two engagements promoting Sweet 7. It was also rumored that Jade Ewen, the UK's 2009 Eurovision Song Contest entrant, would be joining the group and replacing Berrabah. On 21 September, it was revealed that Buchanan, the sole original member of the group, had departed from the Sugababes and replaced by Ewen. Buchanan revealed on Twitter that it was not her decision to leave, resulting in some journalists describing her as having been "sacked".

Critics and fans reacted very negatively to the news, and British broadsheet The Guardian ran an article named "Why the Sugababes' show can't go on without Keisha". Digital Spy ran an article called "Keisha Buchanan, We Salute You" in which they thanked her for her contribution to "incredible pop songs". According to Berrabah and Range, both women had wanted to quit the Sugababes themselves only to find that their group's management decided that they would follow them, rather than find two new members for Buchanan. Buchanan stated in 2020 that she did not know that she was ousted from the group until after the public announcement of her departure had already been made.

The new member, Ewen, was flown to the United States to film the music video for single "About a Girl" mere days after Buchanan had left the group. "About a Girl" reached number 8 in the UK, during a truncated promotion schedule due to Berrabah flying to Austria for treatment for nervous exhaustion resulting from the line-up change. In late 2009, "Wear My Kiss" was confirmed for release in February 2010 as the third single, with the album, originally set for a late November 2009 release, delayed until March 2010. "Wear My Kiss" debuted and peaked at number 7 in the UK, making Sweet 7 the Sugababes' first album since Taller in More Ways to contain at least three top ten hits. The album debuted and peaked at number 14 in the UK but was critically panned due to the loss of an identifiable sound, soul and originality stemming from Buchanan's departure.

In March 2010, former group member Mutya Buena applied to the European Trademarks Authority for ownership of the group's name. The application was submitted amid the controversy of Buchanan's departure, in which Buena insisted that "the Sugababes have ended" without a founding member still in the group. It was confirmed that Buena had obtained rights to use the name on paper, cardboard and goods; namely stationery, paper gift wrap and paper gift wrapping ribbons. In the same month the group was dropped by Roc Nation, due to poor sales of Sweet 7.

2011: Cancelled album and disbandment
The Sugababes initially began recording an eighth studio album in April 2010. In June 2011, the group and their managers Sarah Stennett and Mark Hargreaves Crown Music Management Services left their record label of ten years, Island Records, for a new three-album distribution deal with Sony Music's RCA Records, with Crown Music Management Services as the acting record label. In July, the Sugababes commented on their new album, saying: "It's a bit darker, tougher and quite edgy." In another interview, the group stated the new album showcased their personalities. At the Wireless Festival in London, Buchanan, who was kicked out of the group in 2009, approached the current line-up and the girls were reported to have a "teary" reunion and put the past behind them. It was the first time in two years that she had seen former comrades Range and Berrabah, as well as the first time she had officially met her "replacement" Jade Ewen. In a later interview, Buchanan revealed that she was disappointed by the treatment she received back in 2009, but went on to wish the current line-up "the best of luck".

Their first and only single under the new label, "Freedom", was released for free on 25 September 2011. Afterward, the group began a hiatus to work on solo projects: Range participated in the seventh series of Dancing on Ice, Berrabah worked on solo material and Ewen competed as a contestant on the first series of Splash!

In March 2013, Ewen stated that the Sugababes would likely reform to record new music by the end of the year; though with no set release date, and in May, Berrabah said the group had been writing songs for their new album and hoped to release new music in 2014. However, later the same year, Ewen expressed her feelings towards the Sugababes' future being uncertain, stating they were "pretty much done", which led to reports suggesting the group had split. This was initially denied by Berrabah, who stated she believed the band would get back together in late 2014, but in September 2013, an interview was published quoting Ewen confirming that the group had split two years prior. She was quoted saying "This is a tricky one because I don't feel comfortable lying, saying we're in the studio recording and we're going to bring music out next year, which seems to be the favoured line. I think it's unfair to fans and we should be honest. [...] We kind of fizzled out about two years ago. I do think the lineup changes have obviously got to be a factor, you can't get away from it." In January 2014, Range contradicted Ewen's statement, saying that the group was merely on hiatus to pursue solo projects. However, she later admitted in a June 2020 interview that the group had conceded in 2011 that it would not be fair for them to continue further due to the controversy and their declining popularity after Buchanan's departure.

In March 2019, Berrabah revealed that the Sugababes had been approached several times about reforming for a farewell tour for the fans. In July, in an interview with Irish broadcaster RTÉ, she said that there were discussions about a reunion tour featuring all six members of the group.

2011–2018: Original lineup reformation as Mutya Keisha Siobhán
In October 2011, several news outlets reported that the original line-up of the Sugababes would reform. In January 2012, further speculations circulated that the group would reunite were sparked, after both Buena and Buchanan tweeted that they were in the studio with "two other females" and British rapper Professor Green. However, Buena later denied this on Twitter, saying: "No track [with] keisha or professor G he was around tha studio. im jus workin on my stuff @ tha moment. [sic]" Despite this, Scottish singer-songwriter Emeli Sandé confirmed to MTV UK that she had written new songs for Buena, Buchanan and Donaghy, saying: "Yes, that is true. I've written for the original line-up of the Sugababes, which I'm very happy about because I just loved them when they first came out. I loved their sound, it was so cool. It was very different, so I'm happy to kind of be involved in what started the whole Sugababes journey. It sounds amazing."

In April 2012, it was reported that the line-up had signed a £1 million record deal with Polydor Records. In July 2012, it was officially confirmed that the group had reformed under the name Mutya Keisha Siobhan and were writing songs for a new album under Polydor. The name was officially registered through the European Union on 27 June 2012. The group attended the 2012 Summer Olympics opening ceremony on 27 July 2012 and posted pictures on their official Instagram page, marking the trio's first public appearance together in eleven years. On 6 August the group confirmed they had written two songs with Shaznay Lewis, former member of the All Saints. The next day, Donaghy tweeted "With the girls in the studio. I think the album is finished!!!"

In November 2012, the group were nominated at the Yahoo! Gossip Best Girl Band of 2012 Poll alongside Little Mix, Stooshe, Girls Aloud, The Saturdays and Spice Girls. Their return was named the eleventh biggest moment of 2012 in NME's '75 Moments That Defined 2012' countdown. The group also appeared on the cover of fashion magazine Ponystep in December 2012.

That same month, they performed an intimate gig at Ponystep's New Year's Eve party, performing three Sugababes singles, "Overload", "New Year" and "Freak Like Me". They also did a cover of Rihanna's "Diamonds". The performance marked the first time Buena, Buchanan and Donaghy had performed together in over a decade. A fan-filmed video went viral online, receiving over 70,000 views in just two days. In an interview with BBC News, MKS said that they decided to reform as they felt they still had "something to give".

The first glimpse of new material came to light on 7 January 2013 when the group uploaded a short a cappella clip of their rumoured debut single "Boys" on Buchanan's YouTube account. The clip has been viewed over 140,000 times. The same day, Popjustice released a three-second clip of the studio version of the single, calling it "simply amazing". The group have also signed with Storm Model Management. On 14 March, the group's producer Dev Hynes uploaded a track on his official SoundCloud page, stating the track would not feature on the group's forthcoming album. "Lay Down in Swimming Pools" is a reinterpretation of Kendrick Lamar's "Swimming Pools (Drank)" that features hazy R&B production and three-part harmonies. Hynes later commented saying "Just finished recording new music with Mutya, Keisha and Siobhan, And the girls felt like having a bit of fun at the end of the last session – enjoy!!" On 26 March, the group featured on a remix of Phoenix's single "Entertainment".

The group released the single, "Flatline", in June 2013.

MKS performed their first official headline gig at Scala on 1 August. Among Sugababes classics "Overload", "Run for Cover", "Stronger" and "Freak like Me", the trio also performed several new songs from their forthcoming album, including "I'm Alright", "Love Me Hard", "Boys", "Today" and "No Regrets". "Lay Down in Swimming Pools" and a mash-up of "Flatline" and "Push the Button" served as the encore to the evening. In early October, Mutya Keisha Siobhan appeared on the Google+ Sessions series, performing three live acoustic tracks: new song "No Regrets", the Sugababes classic "Caught in a Moment" and "Royals", a cover of the international number one track by Lorde. The performances are available to view in HD on YouTube. On 6 November 2013, Buena said that she was open to reclaiming the Sugababes name, as Ewen revealed that the fourth line-up split two years earlier. During 8–16 November 2013, the group embarked on the Sacred Three Tour, playing six dates across the UK.

In June 2016, at London Pride's WandsworthRadio special, Donaghy said the album was due the following year. "The Sugababes got a record coming out next year. We've been back and then there was a bit of a break but we're working on it again, so it's exciting. I can't tell you the exact release date of the album. I know but I can't tell you. It's next year."

In August 2017, Buchanan said in an interview that the group were working on new material after their previous work was leaked online.

In June 2018, Donaghy was a guest on Tom Aspaul's podcast Battle Pop and revealed "We're still working together. That's really easy to [say] and reassure fans. We're kind of stronger than ever. Things were really difficult when we were teenagers. The vultures were out, it was new to us and relations were strained or whatever. Then we got back together and you've got to go through that full circle of almost like therapy of working out who you are now and what happened back then. We've done all that now." She added that she had no idea when, or even if, an album would be released.

2019–present: Reclaiming the Sugababes name and The Lost Tapes 
Buchanan, Buena and Donaghy won back the rights to the group name Sugababes in 2019. Later that year, the group appeared with DJ Spoony on his album Garage Classical, covering the 2000 song "Flowers" by Sweet Female Attitude. This marks the group's first release under the name Sugababes after years of working as Mutya Keisha Siobhan. Their comeback performance took place on The Graham Norton Show on 18 October 2019. Following their performance on Graham Norton's show, the group revealed that they were working on new music and a special project for the 20th anniversary of One Touch; however, plans were put on hold due to the COVID-19 pandemic.

On 11 May 2021, Sugababes released a reworking of 2001 single "Run for Cover" featuring MNEK. The same day they announced an expanded 20 Year Anniversary edition of One Touch that would feature unheard demos and remixes from Dev Hynes, Metronomy and others. On 22 June 2021, the Sugababes released a Blood Orange remix to One Touch track "Same Old Story". The album peaked at number 18 on the UK Albums Chart, outperforming the original peak of 26.

Sugababes headlined the second day of June 2022's "Mighty Hoopla" festival in Herne Hill, London. On 20 May 2022 it was announced the band would be supporting Westlife on their Dublin leg. They will make a number of further appearances at music festivals over the summer, including Glastonbury, Portsmouth's Victorious Festival and the Margate Pride Festival.

On 3 June 2022, the 2013 Mutya Keisha Siobhan single, "Flatline", was re-released under the Sugababes name. Sugababes announced their [[*17-date headlining tour, their first in 9 years, on 23 June 2022, starting on 16 October 2022 in Bristol and concluding on 7 November 2022 in Glasgow.

In October 2022, it was announced that the band would support Take That at BST Hyde Park on 1 July 2023 alongside The Script. On 29 November 2022, Sugababes announced they would be playing a one off show at the O2 Arena in London in September 2023, which would be their biggest headlining show ever. On 15 December 2022, Sugababes announced that they would be touring Australia in February 2023 - their first headlining tour of the country.

On 24 December 2022, Sugababes surprise-released the album The Lost Tapes online. The album was originally recorded in 2013 but never received an official release. In a statement online the group stated: "We wrote this album almost 8 years ago and for various reasons it didn't get an official release, so it's with great pride that The Lost Tapes is available now on all streaming platforms". The group also confirmed that the album had been released independently. On 30 December 2022, The Lost Tapes debuted at number 2 on the UK Album Downloads Chart Top 100.

Other endeavours

Merchandise
In April 2007, Mattel teamed with the Sugababes to create a new themed Barbie collection, which was released only in the United Kingdom in May 2007. The Sugababes had also told reporters that they hope to branch out into other areas such as a makeup line. In September 2010, the Sugababes released their own fragrances, named Tempt, Tease and Touch.

Philanthropy
Their cover of Aerosmith and Run-DMC's "Walk This Way", a collaboration with Girls Aloud, was the official charity single for Comic Relief in 2007, recorded at Comic Relief co-founder and trustee Richard Curtis's request. On 27 January 2010, the Sugababes performed at the "Fight Cervical Cancer Event", an event which aims to educate women about cervical cancer. In March 2010, Berrabah jumped 13,000 feet from an aircraft to raise money for a cancer charity. In September 2011, the Sugababes performed "Dancing Queen" by ABBA at the Prince of Wales Theatre for charitable purposes.

Members

Current members 
 Keisha Buchanan (1998–2009, 2012–present)
 Mutya Buena (1998–2005, 2012–present)
 Siobhán Donaghy (1998–2001, 2012–present)

Past members 
 Heidi Range (2001–2011)
 Amelle Berrabah (2005–2011)
 Jade Ewen (2009–2011)

Discography
Studio Albums
One Touch (2000)
Angels with Dirty Faces (2002)
Three (2003)
Taller in More Ways (2005)
Change (2007)
Catfights and Spotlights (2008)
Sweet 7 (2010)
 The Lost Tapes (2022)

Tours

Headlining
Angels with Dirty Faces Tour 
Three Tour 
Taller in More Ways Tour 
Greatest Hits Tour 
Change Tour 
Sacred Three Tour 
Sugababes UK Tour 
Sugababes Australian Tour

Other  shows
One Night Only at the O2

Supporting act
Blazin' Squad – UK Tour  
No Angels – Four Seasons Tour 
Take That – The Ultimate Tour 
Westlife – The Wild Dreams Tour 
Take That – Live at Hyde Park

References

External links

 
 

 
Brit Award winners
British contemporary R&B musical groups
British musical trios
English pop girl groups
English vocal groups
Island Records artists
London Records artists
Musical groups established in 1998
Musical groups from London
RCA Records artists
Roc Nation artists
Vocal trios